Famechon is the name of two communes in France:
 Famechon, Pas-de-Calais
 Famechon, Somme

Famechon is also the name of a former boxing champion, Johnny Famechon.